Thermochrous marginata is a species of moth of the Anomoeotidae family. It is found in Angola.

References

Endemic fauna of Angola
Anomoeotidae
Insects of Angola
Moths of Africa